Adrian John Reynard (born 23 March 1951 in Welwyn, England) is the founder of Reynard Motorsport, which was a successful racing car manufacturer before it went bankrupt in 2002.

As a student, Reynard was keenly interested in motorsport, particularly in the production of record-breaking motorcycles. He attended Oxford Polytechnic (now Oxford Brookes University) and then Cranfield University - in place of the strain gauge he had been expected to present as a final-year project he turned up for his viva voce examination in Mechanical Engineering with a brand new self-designed Formula Ford chassis (which he had to disguise as a Formula Three as he was sponsored by a rival car manufacturer) on a trailer. At Cranfield Reynard was a classmate of Pat Symonds. Teaming up with the experienced mechanic Bill Stone, Reynard set up Sabre Automotive which later became Reynard Motorsport. Reynard's cars were originally built so he could go racing himself; he was successful in Formula Ford and Formula Ford 2000 but the company he built rapidly became successful in many other formulae.

Adrian Reynard had several brushes with Formula One early in his career—he was commissioned to design a Hawke Formula One car for Rupert Keegan in the mid-1970s (this was not seen through—Reynard had never designed a monocoque before), and later became Chief Engineer for RAM-March in 1982 when the team was struggling with overweight copies of the Williams FW07. He claims to have engineered the cars to the state they should have been in at the start of the 1981 season, but little was achieved. While Reynard was undertaking these contracts, other hands continued to run his firm.

A Reynard F1 project went sour in 1991 and took the company to the brink of bankruptcy—Reynard had to sell many of his personal assets—but the firm fought back, continuing to dominate Formula 3000 until it became a single-chassis formula at the end of the 1995 season and entering Champ Car very successfully in 1994. Overly ambitious attempts to expand the company (and, possibly, Adrian Reynard's increasing involvement with British American Racing) led to financial difficulties.

Oxford Brookes university made up for Reynard's lack of a degree by awarding him an honorary doctorate. Adrian Reynard maintains his links with Cranfield University where he is Visiting Professor and serves on the advisory panel for both the Advanced Motorsport Engineering and Advanced Motorsport Mechatronics MSc. He makes an annual award for the best motorsport thesis project at Cranfield.

He received the Queen's Awards for Export Achievement in 1990 and 1996. 

In 2004, Reynard has signed up to join the "Founders" of Virgin Galactic, an elite group of civilians who will be among the first people to ride into space for a price.

In 2009, Reynard has partnered with Andre Brown to relaunch Reynard Racing Cars with a new street legal trackday/race car.

In February 2009, he was linked with Richard Branson's Virgin Group, regarding a takeover of the Honda Racing F1 Team.

Reynard continues to work as a consultant on particular engineering topics within his vehicle engineering skill set. He is also the Chairman of the Auto Research Centre, which has its world headquarters in Indianapolis, Indiana, United States.

Reynard was hired by Ginetta Cars to develop the aerodynamics for their 2018 LMP1 racecar Ginetta G60-LT-P1.

Personal life
Reynard is married to Gill and has five children, two granddaughters and a grandson.

Car collection

Notes

Alumni of Oxford Brookes University
Alumni of Cranfield University
Formula One designers
Living people
1951 births